York old railway station  is a former railway station in the city of York, England.  It is a Grade II* listed building.

Origins

The first York railway station was a temporary building on Queen Street outside the walls of the city.

It was succeeded by what is now the old station, built at the junction of Toft Green, Tanner Row and Station Rise inside the city walls by the Y&NM's architect George Townsend Andrews in 1840. It opened on 4 January 1841.  Andrews also designed the neo-Tudor arch where the walls were breached to allow trains to access the station.

The building

The station was built in an Italianate style.  Its main facade, a symmetrical seventeen-bay three-storey block, faces Tanner Row and Toft Green.  The ground floor is of carboniferous limestone and the upper floors are brick with stone dressings.  Behind this are the remains of the train-shed, which was of iron construction and was largely demolished in 1965.  Beyond the shed, by the city wall, are brick buildings which housed the refreshment rooms and waiting rooms.  They originally consisted of only one storey, but an upper storey was added in 1850.

Andrews also designed the hotel across the head of the lines on Station Rise.  This was completed in 1853 and was the first hotel to be incorporated into a railway station.  After a visit by Queen Victoria, it was named "The Royal Station Hotel".

Closure and afterlife

With the rapid increase in the number of new railway lines during the railway mania and later, this station, originally a terminus, became a part of the route from London to Newcastle and beyond.  Through-trains calling at York had to reverse out of the station to continue their journeys, an inconvenience to railway staff and passengers, and a new through station (the present York railway station), outside the city walls, was planned and eventually built, opening in 1877.  The tracks into the old station, however, remained in use for a further 88 years as carriage storage space. Meanwhile, the railway buildings and hotel were converted into offices.

In February 2010, the City of York Council announced that it intended to convert the station into its new  headquarters, to be known as the West Offices.  A planning application was submitted, and was approved in June 2010. English Heritage and York Civic Trust supported the proposal. Following objections by the Victorian Society to some aspects of the conversion, the application had to await a decision of the Secretary of State, but it was eventually approved and work on refurbishing the building was completed in April 2013. A 'Topping Out' ceremony was conducted by construction and project teams from York Investors LLP, Miller Construction and City of York Council on 17 November 2011. The council moved in during the spring of 2013. An official opening ceremony was conducted on 20 September 2013.

References

Disused railway stations in North Yorkshire
Grade II* listed railway stations
Grade II* listed buildings in York
Former North Eastern Railway (UK) stations
Railway stations in Great Britain opened in 1841
Railway stations in Great Britain closed in 1877
Former York and North Midland Railway stations
George Townsend Andrews railway stations
1877 disestablishments in England
1841 establishments in England